4HI AM is a classic hits-formatted radio station in Emerald, Queensland, owned and operated by Resonate Broadcasting. The station was previous owned by Macquarie Regional Radio until October 2015, following its acquisition of the Smart Radio Group in 2011.

Ownership
4HI is currently owned by Resonate Broadcasting following its acquisition of the Macquarie Regional Radio stations in October 2015. Macquarie Radio Network was forced to sell its regional stations, including 4HI, to comply with ACMA legislation following the merger between the Macquarie Radio Network and Fairfax Media in 2014. Macquarie Radio Network had owned the station since August 2011 after the company acquired the Smart Radio Group at a cost of $6 million.

Broadcast area

4HI broadcasts to the greater Central Highland and Coalfields area of Queensland on a total of eleven transmitters, serving various local communities and coal mines in the region.

The station's main three AM transmitters are located in Emerald, Dysart and Moranbah, while the less powerful FM repeaters are located at Clermont, Rolleston, Sojitz Minerva Mine, BMA Blackwater Mine, Blair Athol Mine, Peak Downs Mine, Goonyella North Mine and Goonyella Riverside Mine.

Programming

4HI is a one-announcer station and only broadcasts a limited amount of weekday programming from the station's Emerald studio, including a three-hour breakfast show, hosted by Joel Reinke, and an hour-long lunchtime program.  There is also sports-themed local programming on 4HI each Saturday morning.

The station relies heavily on nationally syndicated programming from 2GB in Sydney, such as the Ray Hadley Morning Show, the Bed Fordham highlights program and the Continuous Call Team.

4HI also airs a networked drive program each weekday afternoon from 3pm which is broadcast across the Resonate Broadcasting network.

Weekday program guide

Saturday program guide

Sunday program guide

External links
Official website
Facebook Page

Radio stations in Queensland
Radio stations established in 1981
Classic hits radio stations in Australia
Resonate Broadcasting